Cotylelobium lewisianum is a plant in the Dipterocarpaceae family. It is critically endangered.

Distribution 
It is  native to Sri Lanka.

Taxonomy 
It was named by Peter Shaw Ashton in Blumea, 20(2): 358 1972. published in 1973.

References 

Flora of Sri Lanka
Plants described in 1972
Dipterocarpaceae